South Branch flows out of Little Rock Pond northwest of Little Rapids, New York and flows into Stillwater Reservoir west of Little Rapids.

References

Rivers of New York (state)
Rivers of Herkimer County, New York